McFarland State Historic Park is a small historic park located in downtown Florence, Arizona on the corner of Main and Ruggles Streets. The park consists of a preserved courthouse and other buildings dating to the Arizona Territory period. The original structure was built in 1878 with the addition of a jail in 1882 and the courthouse in 1891. The courthouse is listed on the National Register of Historic Places.

McFarland Park reopened February 2011 after repairs and renovations. It had been closed because of Arizona State Parks budget cuts.

McFarland Park commemorates Ernest McFarland (1894-1984), who was successively a US Senator, Governor of Arizona, and Chief Justice of the Arizona Supreme Court. McFarland bought the old courthouse building in 1974, donated it to the state, and paid for its renovation. McFarland State Historic Park
was opened and dedicated October 10, 1979.

Historic First Pinal County Courthouse

References

External links

McFarland State Historic Park
2011 reopening photo gallery

1974 establishments in Arizona
Government buildings completed in 1878
History museums in Arizona
Museums established in 1974
Museums in Pinal County, Arizona
Parks in Pinal County, Arizona
Protected areas established in 1974
State parks of Arizona
Law enforcement museums in the United States
Florence, Arizona